Poul Henrik Eigenbrod (born 19 May 1956), known as Henrik Eigenbrod, is a Danish former association football player and manager. He played in the defender position, and represented Kjøbenhavns Boldklub, Odense Boldklub, as well as Dutch club AZ Alkmaar. He played nine games and scored two goals for the Denmark national football team from 1981 to 1984. He also represented the Denmark national under-21 football team. He was the manager of Jægersborg Boldklub from 1990 to 1993.

References

External links
Haslund profile
Jægersborg Boldklub history 

1956 births
Living people
People from Svendborg
Association football defenders
Danish men's footballers
Danish football managers
Denmark under-21 international footballers
Denmark international footballers
Odense Boldklub players
Kjøbenhavns Boldklub players
AZ Alkmaar players
Sportspeople from the Region of Southern Denmark